"" (Sanskrit: जन गण मन) is the national anthem of the Republic of India. It was originally composed as Bharoto Bhagyo Bidhata in Bengali by polymath Rabindranath Tagore on 11 December 1911. The first stanza of the song Bharoto Bhagyo Bidhata was adopted by the Constituent Assembly of India as the National Anthem on 24 January 1950. A formal rendition of the national anthem takes approximately 52 seconds. A shortened version consisting of the first and last lines (and taking about 20 seconds to play) is also staged occasionally. It was first publicly sung on 27 December 1911 at the Calcutta (now Kolkata) Session of the Indian National Congress.

History
The National Anthem of India is titled "Jana Gana Mana". The song was originally composed in Bengali by India's first Nobel laureate Rabindranath Tagore on 11 December 1911. The parent song, 'Bharoto Bhagyo Bidhata' is a Brahmo hymn which has five verses and only the first verse has been adopted as National Anthem. If put forward succinctly, the National Anthem conveys the spirit of pluralism or in more popular term the concept of 'Unity in Diversity', which lies at the core of India's cultural heritage.

The lyrics of the song first appeared in 5 stanzas in Bengali magazine in an issue of Tatwabodhini patrika. The melody of the song, in raga Alhaiya Bilawal, was composed as a Brahmo Hymn by Tagore himself with possibly some help from his musician grand-nephew Dinendranath Tagore. The final form of the song before the first public performance was set on 11 December 1911.

The song was first publicly sung on the second day of the annual session of the Indian National Congress in Calcutta (now Kolkata) on 27 December 1911 by Rabindranath Tagore's niece in her school assembly. Then, it was followed in January 1912 at the annual event of the Adi Brahmo Samaj, however, it was largely unknown except to the readers of the Adi Brahmo Samaj journal, Tattwabodhini Patrika. The poem was published in January 1912, under the title Bharat Bhagya Bidhata in the Tatwabodhini Patrika, which was the official publication of the Brahmo Samaj with Tagore then the Editor.

In 1912, the song was performed by Sarala Devi Chaudhurani, Tagore's niece, along with the group of school students, in front of prominent Congress members like Bishan Narayan Dhar, Indian National Congress President, and Ambika Charan Majumdar.

In 1917, the song was again performed in Congress conference and this time in aid of instrumental music by the Mahraja Bahadur of Nattore.

Outside of Calcutta, the song was first sung by the bard himself at a session in Besant Theosophical College in Madanapalle, Andhra Pradesh on 28 February 1919 when Tagore visited the college and sang the song. The song enthralled the college students and Margaret Cousins, then vice-principal of the college (also an expert in European music and wife of Irish poet Dr. James Cousins).  Based on the notes provided by Tagore himself, the song was preserved in 1919 in western notation at Madanapalle of Andhra Pradesh  by Mrs. Margaret Cousins and her students.
The whole episode was recorded by Dr. Cousins in his autobiography "We Two Together":
In a voice surprisingly light for so large a man, he sang something like a piece of geography giving a list of countries, mountains and rivers; and in the second verse, a list of the religions in India. The refrain to the first made us pick up our ears. The refrain to the second verse made us clear our throats. We asked for it again and again, and before long we were singing it with gusto: Jaya hai, Jaya hai, Jaya hai, Jaya JayaJayaJaya hai (Victory, victory, victory to thee). We had no idea who or what was to have the victory. The next day Rabindranath gave the swarams(notes) of "Jana gana" to Mrs.Cousins so that the melody should have accurate permanent record. He also made the translation of the song into English as 'The Morning Song of India'.

And thus, Mrs. Cousins became probably the first person to transcribe and preserve Tagore's composition in western sheet music notation at Madanapalle based on the notes provided by Tagore himself. And soon it took its place in the 'daily deciation' of the combined school and college of Besant Hall in Madanapalle and is still sung to this date. It was also here that the song was first translated into English by Tagore as 'The Morning song of India'.

These notations are largely followed to this day, although several subsequent reinterpretations have been made. Interpretations include the B. L. Mukherjee and Ambik Mazumdar interpretation that was played in Germany for the first time under Netaji as the national anthem of India, as well as the interpretation of Ram Singh Thakuri for its INA translation to Hindustani as 'sab sukh chain.

The song was selected as national anthem by Subhas Chandra Bose while he was in Germany. On the occasion of the founding meeting of the German-Indian Society on 11 September 1942 in the Hotel Atlantic in Hamburg, "Jana Gana Mana" was played for the first time by the Hamburg Radio Symphony Orchestra as the national anthem of an independent India.

Before it officially became the national anthem of India in 1950, "Jana Gana Mana" was heard in the 1945 film Hamrahi. It was also adopted as a school song of The Doon School, Dehradun in 1935.

On the occasion of India attaining freedom, the Indian Constituent Assembly assembled for the first time as a sovereign body on 14 August 1947, midnight and the session closed with a unanimous performance of "Jana Gana Mana".

The members of the Indian Delegation to the General Assembly of the United Nations held at New York in 1947 gave a recording of "Jana Gana Mana" as the country's national anthem. The song was played by the house orchestra in front of a gathering consisting of representatives from all over the world.

Code of conduct
The National Anthem of India is played or sung on various occasions. Instructions have been issued from time to time about the correct versions of the Anthem, the occasions on which these are to be played or sung, and about the need for paying respect to the anthem by observance of proper decorum on such occasions. The substance of these instructions has been embodied in the information sheet issued by the government of India for general information and guidance. The approximate duration of the Full Version of National Anthem of India is 52 seconds and 20 seconds for shorter version.

Lyrics

The poem was composed in a literary register of the Bengali language called Sadhu Bhasha, which is heavily Sanskritised.

Original translation from Bengali 
The English version was translated by Rabindranath Tagore on 28 February 1919 at the Besant Theosophical College.

Official lyrics in Hindi

Abridged version
A short version consisting of the first and last lines of the National Anthem is also played on certain occasions.

Raga used in the Anthem

"Jana Gana Mana" is sung in the raga Alhaiya Bilawal. In the national anthem, the  Madhyama svara is employed. Some argue that considering the raag used in National Anthem in raag Bilawal and it being a raag composed of shuddh swar; presents this anomaly. This line of thought presents the composition of the National Anthem in raga Gaud Sarang which employs has the  Madhyama svara. However one must also note that it is quite common for compositions in a raag to employ vivadi swara. Alhaiya Bilawal is sung with  Madhyama and it is quite often called raag bilawal.

Gallery

Controversies

Historical significance
The composition was first sung during a convention of the Indian National Congress in Calcutta on 27 December 1911. It was sung on the second day of the convention. The event was reported as such in the British Indian press:
"The Bengali poet Rabindranath Tagore sang a song composed by him specially to welcome the Emperor." (Statesman, 28 December 1911)
"The proceedings began with the singing by Rabindranath Tagore of a song specially composed by him in honour of the Emperor." (Englishman, 28 December 1911)
"When the proceedings of the Indian National Congress began on Wednesday 27 December 1911, a Bengali song in welcome of the Emperor was sung. A resolution welcoming the Emperor and Empress was also adopted unanimously." (Indian, 29 December 1911)

Many historians aver that the newspaper reports cited above were misguided. The confusion arose in the Indian press since a different song, "Badshah Humara" written in Hindi by Rambhuj Chaudhary, was sung on the same occasion in praise of the George V. The nationalist press in India stated this difference of events clearly:
"The proceedings of the Congress party session started with a prayer in Bengali to praise God (song of benediction). This was followed by a resolution expressing loyalty to King George V. Then another song was sung welcoming King George V." (Amrita Bazar Patrika, 28 December 1911)
 "The annual session of Congress began by singing a song composed by the great Bengali poet Rabindranath Tagore. Then a resolution expressing loyalty to King George V was passed. A song paying a heartfelt homage to King George V was then sung by a group of boys and girls." (The Bengalee, 28 December 1911)

Even the report of the annual session of the Indian National Congress of December 1911 stated this difference:
"On the first day of 28th annual session of the Congress, proceedings started after singing Vande Mataram. On the second day the work began after singing a patriotic song by Babu Rabindranath Tagore. Messages from well-wishers were then read and a resolution was passed expressing loyalty to King George V. Afterwards the song composed for welcoming King George V and Queen Mary was sung."

On 10 November 1937, Tagore wrote a letter to Pulin Bihari Sen about the controversy. That letter in Bengali can be found in Tagore's biography Rabindrajibani, volume II page 339 by Prabhatkumar Mukherjee.
 "A certain high official in His Majesty's service, who was also my friend, had requested that I write a song of felicitation towards the Emperor. The request simply amazed me. It caused a great stir in my heart. In response to that great mental turmoil, I pronounced the victory in Jana Gana Mana of that Bhagya Bidhata [ed. God of Destiny] of India who has from age after age held steadfast the reins of India's chariot through rise and fall, through the straight path and the curved. That Lord of Destiny, that Reader of the Collective Mind of India, that Perennial Guide, could never be George V, George VI, or any other George. Even my official friend understood this about the song. After all, even if his admiration for the crown was excessive, he was not lacking in simple common sense."

Again in his letter of 19 March 1939 Tagore writes:
"I should only insult myself if I cared to answer those who consider me capable of such unbounded stupidity as to sing in praise of George the Fourth or George the Fifth as the Eternal Charioteer leading the pilgrims on their journey through countless ages of the timeless history of mankind."
(Purvasa, Phalgun, 1354, p. 738.)

These clarifications by Tagore regarding the controversy occurred only after the death of King George V in 1936. Earlier, in 1915, after Tagore was awarded the Nobel Literature Prize, George V had conferred a knighthood on him, which he renounced in 1919 in protest over the Jallianwala Bagh massacre; writing a letter addressed to viceroy of India Lord Chelmsford: "The time has come when badges of honour make our shame glaring in their incongruous context of humiliation, and I for my part wish to stand, shorn of all special distinctions, by the side of my country men."

Singing

In Kerala, students belonging to the Jehovah's Witnesses religious denomination were expelled by school authorities for their refusal to sing the national anthem on religious grounds, although they stood up when the anthem was sung. The Kerala High Court concluded that there was nothing in it which could offend anyone's religious susceptibilities, and upheld their expulsion. On 11 August 1986, the Supreme Court reversed the High Court and ruled that the High Court had misdirected itself because the question is not whether a particular religious belief or practice appeals to our reason or sentiment but whether the belief is genuinely and conscientiously held as part of the profession or practice of a religion. "Our personal views and reactions are irrelevant." The Supreme Court affirmed the principle that it is not for a secular judge to sit in judgment on the correctness of a religious belief.

The Supreme Court observed in its ruling that:

In some states, it is mandatory that the anthem be played before films played at cinemas. On 30 November 2016, to instil "committed patriotism and nationalism", the Supreme Court ordered that all cinemas nationwide must play the national anthem, accompanied by an image of the flag of India, before all films. Patrons were expected to stand in respect of the anthem, and doors to a cinema hall were expected to be locked during the anthem to minimise disruption. The order was controversial, as it was argued that patrons who chose not to participate would be targeted and singled out, as was the case in an incident publicized in 2015 which purported to show a group of patrons (alleged by the YouTube uploader to be Muslims) being heckled by others. On 10 February 2017, two Kashmiris (which included an employee of the state government) were arrested under the Prevention of Insults to National Honour Act for not standing during the anthem at a cinema, in the first such arrest of its kind made by a state government. Other incidents of violent outbreaks associated with the policy were also reported.

A cinema club in Kerala (whose film festival was required to comply with the order, leading to several arrests) challenged the order as an infringement of their fundamental rights, arguing that cinemas were "singularly unsuited for the gravitas and sobriety that must accompany the playing of the national anthem", and that the films screened would often "be at odds with sentiments of national respect". In October 2017, Justice Dhananjaya Y. Chandrachud questioned the intent of the order, arguing that citizens "don't have to wear patriotism on our sleeve", and it should not be assumed that people who do not stand for the anthem were any less patriotic than those who did. In January 2018, the order was lifted, pending further government discussion.

In October 2019, a video of a Bengaluru couple being bullied for not standing up during the national anthem in a movie hall went viral. They were questioned "Are you Pakistani?". There was a debate on the issue; some lawyers recalled Article-21, some people called it a way to gain media attention and some recommended to attend the movie after the national anthem is played to avoid any problems. But after the debate, Supreme Court had reversed its earlier order making it mandatory for cinema halls to play the National Anthem.

Regional aspects

Another controversy is that only those provinces that were under direct British rule, i.e. Punjab, Sindh, Gujarat, Maratha, Dravida (South India), Utkal and Bengal, were mentioned. None of the princely states – Jammu and Kashmir, Rajputana, Hyderabad, Mysore or the states in Northeast India, which are now parts of India, were mentioned. But opponents of this proposition claim that Tagore mentioned only the border states of India to include complete India. Whether the princely states would form a part of an independent Indian republic was a matter of debate even until Indian independence.

In 2005, there were calls to delete the word "Sindh" and substitute it with the word Kashmir. The argument was that Sindh was no longer a part of India, having become part of Pakistan as a result of the Partition of 1947. Opponents of this proposal hold that the word "Sindh" refers to the Indus and to Sindhi culture, and that Sindhi people are a part of India's cultural fabric. The Supreme Court of India declined to change the national anthem and the wording remains unchanged.

On 17 December 2013, MLA of Assam, Phani Bhushan Choudhury cited article of The Times of India published on 26 January 1950, stating that originally the word 'Kamarup' was included in the song, but was later changed to 'Sindhu' and claimed that Kamarup should be re-included. To this, the then minister Rockybul Hussain replied that the state government would initiate steps in this regard after response from the newspaper. The debate was further joined by the then minister Ardhendu Dey, mentioning 'Sanchayita' (edited by Tagore himself) etc. where he said Kamrup was not mentioned.

In 2017 the state government of Jharkhand under the Bharatiya Janata Party proposed making the singing of the national anthem compulsory in Madrasas. This was met with opposition from a section of Muslim cleric on the grounds that it violated the basic principles of the Islamic centers of learning.

See also
Vande Mataram, the National Song of India
"Saare Jahan Se Achcha"
"Amar Shonar Bangla", the National Anthem of Bangladesh, also written by Rabindranath Tagore
 National Pledge

Notes

References

External links

Know India: National anthem, Government of India website
English translation of the hymn "Jana Gana Mana" in Tagore's handwriting

Bengali-language literature
Rabindra Sangeet
Indian songs
Asian anthems
National symbols of India
Indian patriotic songs
Songs written by Rabindranath Tagore
Bengali-language songs
Bengali music
National anthems
National anthem compositions in E-flat major
Poems by Rabindranath Tagore